Henrique Honorato (born ) is a Brazilian indoor volleyball player. He is a current member of the Brazil men's national volleyball team.

Career
He participated at the 2017 FIVB Volleyball Men's U21 World Championship and 2019 FIVB Volleyball Men's Nations League.

Sporting achievements

National team
 2018  Pan-American Cup
 2019  Pan American Games

Individuals
 2017 U21 Pan-American Cup – Best Outside Spiker

References

External links
 FIVB Biography

1997 births
Living people
Brazilian men's volleyball players
People from Campina Grande
Pan American Games medalists in volleyball
Pan American Games bronze medalists for Brazil
Volleyball players at the 2019 Pan American Games
Medalists at the 2019 Pan American Games
Sportspeople from Paraíba